
Year 440 BC was a year of the pre-Julian Roman calendar. At the time, it was known as the Year of the Consulship of Macerinus and Lanatus (or, less frequently, year 314 Ab urbe condita). The denomination 440 BC for this year has been used since the early medieval period, when the Anno Domini calendar era became the prevalent method in Europe for naming years.

Events 
 By place 
 Greece 
 Samos, an autonomous member of the Delian League and one of Athens' principal allies with a substantial fleet of its own, quarrels with Miletus and appeals to Athens for assistance. Pericles decides in favour of Miletus, so Samos revolts. Pericles then sails to Samos with a fleet to overthrow its oligarchic government and install a democratic one. Sparta threatens to interfere. However, at a congress of the Peloponnesian League, its members vote not to intervene on behalf of Samos against Athens.

 Roman Republic 
 A famine strikes in Rome.

 China 
 Zhou Kao Wang becomes King of the Zhou Dynasty of China.

 By topic 
 Physics 
 Democritus proposes the existence of indivisible particles, which he calls atoms.

 Art 
 Polykleitos completes one of his greatest statues, the Doryphorus (The Spear Bearer) (approximate date).
 The stela, Demeter, Persephone and Triptolemos, from Eleusis, is made (approximate date). It is now kept at the National Archaeological Museum of Athens.
 A temple for Poseidon is erected in Sounion.

Births 

 Cynisca, Greek princess of Sparta

Deaths 
 Ducetius, a Hellenized leader of the Sicels and founder of a united Sicilian state
 Ezra, Jewish scribe and priest (b. c. 480 BCE)

References